Walter Lapeyre (born 9 February 1976) is a pistol shooter from Bordeaux, France.

Palmares

Olympic Games

World Cups 
  ISSF World Cup Bangkok 2007 : Gold Medal in 10 m Air Pistol
  ISSF World Cup Sydney 2007 : Bronze Medal in 10 m Air Pistol
  ISSF World Cup Brazil 2006 : Bronze Medal in 10 m Air Pistol

European Championships 
 European Championships 2008 (Winterthur, Switzerland) :
  Silver Medal in 10 m Air Pistol
 European Championships 2007 (Deauville, France) :
  Silver Team Medal in 10 m Air Pistol
 European Championships 2006 (Moscow, Russia) :
  Bronze Medal
  Gold Team Medal in 10 m Air Pistol (Walter Lapeyre, Franck Dumoulin, Manuel Alexandre-Augrand)
 European Championships 2005 (Tallinn, Estonia) :
  Gold Medal in 10 m Air Pistol

France Championships 
 France Champion in 50 m Pistol in 1999, 2005, 2006, 2007, 2008 and 2011
 France Champion in 10 m Air Pistol in 2005, 2008, 2011 and 2012

Personal bests 
 10 m Air Pistol : 590/600
 50 m Pistol : 571/600

External links 
 French Federation WebSite

1976 births
Living people
Sportspeople from Bordeaux
French male sport shooters
ISSF pistol shooters
Shooters at the 2008 Summer Olympics
Shooters at the 2012 Summer Olympics
Olympic shooters of France
21st-century French people